Justice Hovey may refer to:

Alvin Peterson Hovey, associate justice of the Supreme Court of Indiana
Chester Ralph Hovey, associate justice of the Washington Supreme Court